The Little Rock, Mississippi River and Texas Railway (L. R., M. R. & T.) was an American railway company that operated in southeastern Arkansas from 1875 to 1887.

History
The mainline to Pine Bluff was completed by the Little Rock, Pine Bluff and New Orleans Railroad in 1873, and then to Little Rock by the Little Rock, Mississippi River and Texas Railway on February 25, 1881. Sold under foreclosure to the St. Louis, Iron Mountain and Southern Railway on January 28, 1887, it was subsequently merged into the Missouri Pacific Railroad. Today, most of the line is owned and operated by Union Pacific.

See also
 List of Arkansas railroads

References

External links

 
1875 establishments in Arkansas
1875 mergers and acquisitions
1887 disestablishments in Arkansas
1887 mergers and acquisitions
American companies established in 1875
American companies disestablished in 1887
Companies based in Little Rock, Arkansas
Defunct Arkansas railroads
Foreclosure
Predecessors of the Missouri Pacific Railroad
Railway companies established in 1875
Railway companies disestablished in 1887
Standard gauge railways in the United States